The Kaneohe Ranch Building at Castle Junction, where the Pali Highway (Route 61), Kamehameha Highway (Route 83), and Kalanianaole Highway (Route 72) intersect on the windward side of Oahu, was built in 1940 to be the headquarters of Kaneohe Ranch, which owned  of surrounding land and played a major role in the history of Kāneohe and Kailua. The building is significant both for its association with the Ranch and for its Hawaiian style architecture designed by Albert Ely Ives (1898-1966). Ives' other work on the windward side includes Plantation Estate which is the Winter White House of Barack Obama.  The building was added to the National Register of Historic Places on 5 June 1987.

The building exhibits key features of the style of Hawaiian architecture that developed during the 1920s and 1930s: the double-pitched Dickey roof with overhanging eaves, plaster-covered masonry walls, and ample cross-ventilation. Its architect was best known for his residential work; this is one of his few commercial buildings.

During the mid-19th century, most of the land in the area belonged to Kalama, Queen Consort of Kamehameha III and later Queen Dowager of the Kingdom of Hawaii. She and Judge Charles Coffin Harris began a sugarcane plantation on the land, but after she died in 1870 and it failed in 1871, the land eventually passed to Harris's daughter, Nannie H. Rice, who in 1893 leased  to J. P. Mendonca, who founded Kaneohe Ranch in 1894. Lower-lying wetlands were leased to Chinese rice farmers. In 1907 James Bicknell Castle became the principal stockholder of the Ranch, and 1917 his son, Harold K.L. Castle, purchased the land from Mrs. Rice. Most of the land was used for cattle-ranching until World War II, when the military took over much of it. After the war, former ranch lands have provided room for ever expanding residential subdivisions.

Gallery

References

Commercial buildings on the National Register of Historic Places in Hawaii
Hawaiian architecture
Office buildings in Hawaii
Buildings and structures in Honolulu County, Hawaii
Commercial buildings in Hawaii
National Register of Historic Places in Honolulu County, Hawaii